The geniohyoid muscle is a narrow paired muscle situated superior to the medial border of the mylohyoid muscle.  It is named for its passage from the chin ("genio-" is a standard prefix for "chin") to the hyoid bone.

Structure 
The geniohyoid is a paired short muscle that  arises from the inferior mental spine, on the back of the mandibular symphysis, and runs backward and slightly downward, to be inserted into the anterior surface of the body of the hyoid bone. It lies in contact with its fellow of the opposite side. It thus belongs to the suprahyoid muscles. The muscle receives its blood supply from branches of the lingual artery.

Innervation
The geniohyoid muscle is innervated by fibres from the first cervical spinal nerve travelling alongside the hypoglossal nerve. Although the first three cervical nerves give rise to the ansa cervicalis, the geniohyoid muscle is said to be innervated by the first cervical nerve, as some of its efferent fibers do not contribute to ansa cervicalis.

Variations
It may be blended with the one on opposite side or double; slips to greater cornu of hyoid bone and genioglossus occur.

Function 
The geniohyoid muscle brings the hyoid bone forward and upwards. This dilates the upper airway, assisting respiration. During the first act of deglutition, when the mass of food is being driven from the mouth into the pharynx, the hyoid bone, and with it the tongue, is carried upward and forward by the anterior bellies of the Digastrici, the Mylohyoidei, and Geniohyoidei. It also assists in depressing the mandible.

History
The inclined position of the geniohyoid muscle has been contrasted to the horizontal position in neanderthals.

Additional images

See also

References

External links 
 
 
 Frontal section

Muscles of the head and neck
Suprahyoid muscles